Christopher Felipe Díaz Peña (born 25 July 1995) is a Chilean footballer who currently plays for Rangers as a right-back.

Club career 
Díaz began his career at his local side Curicó Unido in 2013, before moving to Canada with United Soccer League side Whitecaps FC 2.

On 2 January 2019, Cobreloa announced the signing of Díaz. In 2020, he joined Rangers de Talca.

International career
In 2014, he took part of Chile U20 squad in friendly matches against Paraguay U20. In addition, he performed as a sparring for the Chile senior team.

Honours
Curicó Unido
 Primera B de Chile: 2016-17

References

External links 
 
 

1995 births
Living people
People from Curicó
Chilean footballers
Chile under-20 international footballers
Chilean expatriate footballers
Curicó Unido footballers
San Antonio Unido footballers
Whitecaps FC 2 players
Cobreloa footballers
Rangers de Talca footballers
Primera B de Chile players
Segunda División Profesional de Chile players
Chilean Primera División players
USL Championship players
Chilean expatriate sportspeople in the United States 
Chilean expatriate sportspeople in Canada
Expatriate soccer players in Canada
Association football defenders